This is an episode list for the sitcom Father Ted created by Arthur Mathews and Graham Linehan, and was produced by Hat Trick Productions for Channel 4. It stars Dermot Morgan, Ardal O'Hanlon, Frank Kelly and Pauline McLynn. The series is set on the fictional Craggy Island off the coast of Ireland and is about three Roman Catholic priests and their housekeeper.

Series overview

Episodes

Series 1 (1995)

Series 2 (1996)

Christmas Special (1996)

Series 3 (1998)

Comic Relief

The annual telethon Comic Relief, aired on 14 March 1997, included a scene in which Ted and Dougal are enlisted to host the telethon. Ted is baffled as to why Comic Relief has selected two unknown Irish priests for the job. Dougal theorises that God planned the event as an opportunity for Ted to atone for stealing money from a charity. Ted decides God may forgive him if they succeed in raising the target sum of eight million pounds.

Best episode

Most popular episodes

A 1999 poll conducted by the popular fansite The Craggy Island Examiner concluded that the best episodes were:
 "Song For Europe" (22%)
 "Are You Right There, Father Ted?" (19%)
 "Good Luck, Father Ted" and "Speed 3" (11% each)
"Night of the Nearly Dead" "(10% each)"
followed by:
"The Old Grey Whistle Theft"
"New Jack City"
"The Plague"
"Kicking Bishop Brennan Up the Arse"
"Cigarettes and Alcohol and Rollerblading"

Notably, only one of these ten episodes was from Series 1 ("Good Luck, Father Ted").

Ted Fest 2007

At the inaugural Ted Fest, "New Jack City" was voted best episode.

Father Ted Night 2011 (Channel 4)

Father Ted Night, broadcast on New Year's Day 2011 on Channel 4, named "Speed 3" as the fans' favourite episode. "Kicking Bishop Brennan Up the Arse" is named as the writers' favourite episode.

References

External links
List of episodes at the Internet Movie Database.
 Playlist of Episodes

 
Lists of British sitcom episodes